The gray-tailed narrow-headed rat (Stenocephalemys griseicauda) is a species of rodent in the family Muridae.
It is found only in Ethiopia.
Its natural habitats are subtropical or tropical moist montane forests, subtropical or tropical high-elevation shrubland, and subtropical or tropical high-elevation grassland.
It is threatened by habitat loss.

References

 Lavrenchenko, L. & Corti, M. 2004.  Stenocephalemys griseicauda.   2006 IUCN Red List of Threatened Species.   Downloaded on 9 July 2007.

Stenocephalemys
Mammals of Ethiopia
Mammals described in 1972
Taxonomy articles created by Polbot
Endemic fauna of Ethiopia
Ethiopian montane moorlands